

Track listing

 Intro – Various Artists
 It's a Stickup – Drummond, Willus
 Irritating Dove – DJ Yoda & Cymande/Bob James
 Eye on the Gold Chain – Ugly Duckling (2)
 Gotta Rock – Stupid Poo & Treacherous 3/Kool Moe Dee
 Scratch Skit – DJ Plus One
 Mexican Policemen At The Alien Mardi Gras – DJ Yoda & Bob James
 Yoda Meets the Thunderbirds – DJ Yoda
 Roll With The Yaggfu – Yaggfu Front
 Dunes And Sounds – DJ Yoda & Bob James
 Scratch Skit 2 – DJ Benny G
 Delta Ebonics – DJ Yoda
 Give It To Y'all – Rock, Pete & Rocky Marciano/Trife
 Perverted Disturbances – DJ Yoda & Cymande/Rimshots/Bob James
 Salvation Barmy – Barman, MC Paul
 Scratch Skit 3 – A-Trak
 Sesame Sex – DJ Yoda
 Global Warming – Nextmen & Kerosene
 Jiving Question Remains – DJ Yoda & Bob James
 Something For The People – Nigo & Biz Markie
 Sugarhill Commercial – Various Artists
 Scratch Skit 4 – DJ Spinbad
 Dizzy Gillespie Plays The Sax – DJ Yoda & Dizzy Gillespie/Cymande/Parliament
 Balti Taxi – DJ Yoda & Bob James
 Astronaut – Quasimoto
 Yoda Meets Dr Who – DJ Yoda
 On The Reggae – Lar & Dennis Alcapone/Desmond Dekker/Harry J Allstars/Sly &The Revolutionaries/Roots Radics
 Back Up – King Tee & Phil The Agony
 Golf Food And Scratching – DJ Yoda & Fatback Band/Mother Freedom Band/Cymande
 Mic Manipulator – Edan
 French Collection – DJ Yoda & Bob James
 Goin' To See My Baby – Car Trouble & William De Vaughan/Fatback Band
 Automobile – Parliament
 Scratch Skit 5 – DJ Yoda
 Outro – Various Artists

Reception
Rick Anderson of All Music Guide described How to Cut and Paste Vol.1 as a master class in Dj technique while still keep the humour that DJ Yoda is known for.

References

2001 compilation albums
DJ Yoda albums